Kabansky District (Khabaanskhyn aimag) is an administrative and municipal district (raion), one of the twenty-one in the Republic of Buryatia, Russia. It is located in the center of the republic. Its administrative center is the rural locality (a selo) of Kabansk. As of the 2010 Census, the total population of the district was 59,883, with the population of Kabansk accounting for 10.1% of that number.

Administrative and municipal status
Within the framework of administrative divisions, Kabansky District is one of the twenty-one in the Republic of Buryatia. It is divided into one town (an administrative division with the administrative center in the town (an inhabited locality) of Babushkin), two urban-type settlements (administrative divisions with the administrative centers, correspondingly, in the urban-type settlements (inhabited localities) of Kamensk and Selenginsk), thirteen selsoviets, and one somon, all of which comprise fifty-nine rural localities. As a municipal division, the district is incorporated as Kabansky Municipal District. The town (without its rural localities) and the two urban-type settlements are incorporated as three urban settlements, and the thirteen selsoviets, one somon, and the rural localities of the Town of Babushkin are incorporated as sixteen rural settlements within the municipal district. The selo of Kabansk serves as the administrative center of both the administrative and municipal district.

References

Notes

Sources

Districts of Buryatia